Hugh Marjoribanks (12 August 1933 – 3 May 2017) was an Australian cricketer. He played four first-class matches for New South Wales in 1958/59.

See also
 List of New South Wales representative cricketers

References

External links
 

1933 births
2017 deaths
Australian cricketers
New South Wales cricketers
Sportspeople from Mackay, Queensland